The Good Detective is a South Korean television series starring Son Hyun-joo, Jang Seung-jo, Lee Elijah, Oh Jung-se and Ji Seung-hyun. It aired on JTBC from July 6 to August 25, 2020.

The drama was considered a success with the viewership ratings doubled from the start to finish and the possibility of sequel mentioned by production team. It was confirmed to return for second season which is scheduled to begin production around October 2021.

The season 2 began airing from July 30, 2022 on Saturday and Sunday at 22:30 (KST).

Series overview

Synopsis
Set in Incheon, South Korea, the drama tells stories of those who try to hide ugly truths and those who uncover the truths.

Kang Do-chang (Son Hyun-joo) has worked as a detective for the past 18 years. He was born and raised in Incheon. He investigates cases using his experience and personal connections, forgoing scientific technique or reasoning power.

Oh Ji-hyuk (Jang Seung-jo) is an elite detective. He has 9 years of experience. Unlike Kang Do-chang, he investigates cases using evidence and insight into the criminal's psyche. Due to trauma from his childhood, he does not share his feelings. He is wealthy thanks to his late uncle, who left him with a large inheritance.

Jin Seo-kyung (Lee Elijah) works as a newspaper reporter. She is a 5 year veteran and passionate about her work.

Cast

Overview

Main
 Son Hyun-joo as Kang Do-chang
A tough and loyal detective of 18 years who investigates cases using his experience and personal connections, forgoing scientific technique or reasoning power. He is a senior detective of the Violent Crimes Division 2.
 Jang Seung-jo as Oh Ji-hyuk
An elite homicide detective of 9 years, Oh Ji-hyuk investigates cases using evidence and insight into the criminal's psyche, unlike Kang Do-chang. He has insomnia due to past trauma.
 Lee Elijah as Jin Seo-kyung (Season 1)
A passionate veteran reporter who isn't afraid to reveal the truth and doesn't give in to outside pressure. After being known as a fierce freelance reporter, she was hired by Yoo Jung-seok for Junghan Daily.
 Oh Jung-se as Oh Jong-tae (Season 1)
A chaebol businessman with questionable morals. He is Oh Ji-hyuk's cousin.
 Ji Seung-hyun as Yoo Jung-seok (Season 1)
The head of Junghan Daily's social affairs department and Jin Seo-kyung's boss.
 Kim Hyo-jin as Cheon Na-na (Season 2) 
 Director of TJ Group born out of wedlock to the group president and treated like an orphan.
 Jung Moon-sung as Woo Tae-ho (Season 2)
 TJ group's legal team leader and husband Cheon Nana.

Supporting

West Incheon Police
 Son Jong-hak as Moon Sang-bum
Senior detective and Chief of West Incheon Police Station.
 Jo Hee-bong as Woo Bong-shik 
Senior detective and team leader of Violent Crimes Division 2.
 Cha Rae-hyung as Kwon Jae-hong
 Incheon West Police Station Violent Team 2 Detectives (Sergeant) 
 Kim Ji-hoon as Byun Ji-woong
 Incheon West Police Station Violent Team 2 Detectives (Sergeant)
 Jung Soon-won as Ji Man-goo
Incheon Western Police Station Violent Team 2 Detective (Superintendent)
 Kim Myung-joon as Shim Dong-wook
 Incheon Western Police Station Violent Team 2 Detective (Superintendent)
 Season 1
 Yang Hyun-min as Nam Guk-hyun 
Team Leader of Violent Crimes Division 1.
 Shin Dong-mi as Yoon Sang-mi 
A former detective who was promoted as an investigator of the Incheon West Police Station. She is investigating Kang Do-chang regarding his potential promotion.

TJ Group 
 Choi Dae-hoon as Cheon Sang-woo
 Cheon Na-na's half-brother.
 Hong Seo-young as Moon Bo-kyung
 Team staff to fight between the 2nd strongest team and the TJ group.
 Park Won-sang as Choi Yong-geun
 The leader of the legal team that ignites the power struggle between the brothers.
 Song Young-chang as Cheon Seong-dae
 Chairman of TJ Group.

Seoul Metropolitan Police Agency 
 Lee Joong-ok as Jang Ki-jin
 The team leader of the Seoul Metropolitan Police Agency.
 Hong Sang-pyo as Jo Jin-cheol
 Detectives from the Seoul Central Investigation Unit.

Kang Do-chang's family
 Baek Eun-hye as Kang Eun-hee
 Do-chang's younger sister
 Yang Hee-won as Jae-woong
 Kang Eun-hee's son
 Lee Ha-eun as Lee Eun-hye 
 Lee Dae-chul's daughter and Kang Do-chang's adopted daughter.
 Season 1
 Park Ji-hwan as Kang Eun-hee's ex-husband and Jae-woong's father

Others
 Season 1
 Jo Jae-yoon as Lee Dae-chul, a death row inmate convicted of murdering Yoon Ji-sun. 
 Kim Ryeo-eun as Yoon Ji-sun, a painter and the murder victim.
 Lee Seung-hoon as So Jae-sub, a lawyer who takes the case of Lee Dae-chul's retrial.
 Son Byong-ho as Kim Gi-tae, a former public prosecutor who was caught in a corruption scandal and is in prison.
 Jo Jae-ryong as Jo Sung-dae, Kim Gi-tae's subordinate.
 Ahn Si-ha as Jung Yoo-seon, widow of the late detective Jang Jin-su.
 Hwang Tae-gwang as Jang Jin-su, he was in charge of Yoon Ji-sun's murder case and died during investigation.
 Lee Sang-woon as Song Gwang-hee, reporter at Junghan Daily.
 Shin Jae-hwi as Park Hong-doo
 Lee Hyun-wook as Park Gun-ho, a former prison guard who wants to prove Lee Dae Chul is innocent.
 Season 2
 Park Geun-hyung as Jung In-beom, Jung Hee-joo's grandfather who is a victim in a serial murder case.
 Lee Seung-joon as Lee Han-joo, a prison guard.
 Bang Eun-jung as Sung Joo-ri
 Kim In-kwon as Lee Seong-gon, the bus driver in the city where the incident took place.
 Shin Ha-young as Jung Hee-joo, Victim Serial Murder and Hand-Painted Punctuation Shop Owner.
 Baek Sang-hee as Kim Min-ji, Was a victim of Cheon Sang-woo's assault case.
 Jo Tae-gwan as Michael Cha, CEO of McQueen Korea.
 Park Ye-ni as Laura Kane, Lee Seong-gon's younger sister.

Special appearances
 Season 2
 Park Hyo-joo as bride of Kang Do-chang
 Ko Chang-seok as Cha Moon-ho, Incheon District Office Prosecutor

Production
Early working title of the series is Silence.

The series was originally scheduled to premiere on April 27, 2020 but it was pushed back to July due to the COVID-19 pandemic.

After the series ended, executive producer Jo Jun-hyung revealed the possibility of a sequel in the interview with media.

On February 28, 2022, it was confirmed that actor Son Hyun-joo had tested positive for COVID-19, causing filming for season 2 to be suspended.

On March 7, 2022, it was reported that actor Son Hyeon-joo was released from Corona 19 quarantine on the 5th and resumed filming for season 2. The filming was completed in May 2022.

On June 28, 2022, a poster of Season 2 was released.

Viewership

Season 1

Season 2

International broadcast
 : TV3 (23 June 2021)

References

External links
  
   Season 2
 
 
  Season 2

JTBC television dramas
Korean-language television shows
2020 South Korean television series debuts
2022 South Korean television series endings
South Korean crime television series
Television shows set in Incheon
Television productions suspended due to the COVID-19 pandemic
Television series by Blossom Entertainment
Television series by JTBC Studios